Filip Arežina (born 8 November 1992) is a Bosnian professional footballer who plays as a midfielder for NK Celik Zenica.

International career
Arežina made his first international appearance in a Kirin Cup friendly game final against Japan on 7 June 2016, having substituted Mario Vrančić in the 89th minute.

Honours
Zrinjski Mostar
Bosnian Premier League: 2015–16

Bosnia and Herzegovina 
Kirin Cup: 2016

References

External links

1992 births
Living people
People from Gornji Vakuf
Croats of Bosnia and Herzegovina
Association football midfielders
Bosnia and Herzegovina footballers
Bosnia and Herzegovina international footballers
HŠK Zrinjski Mostar players
FK Olimpik players
NK Rudeš players
FK Rudar Prijedor players
GKS Tychy players
FK Mladost Doboj Kakanj players
FK Željezničar Sarajevo players
NK Lokomotiva Zagreb players
FK Tuzla City players
Premier League of Bosnia and Herzegovina players
First Football League (Croatia) players
First League of the Federation of Bosnia and Herzegovina players
I liga players
Croatian Football League players
Bosnia and Herzegovina expatriate footballers
Expatriate footballers in Croatia
Bosnia and Herzegovina expatriate sportspeople in Croatia
Expatriate footballers in Poland
Bosnia and Herzegovina expatriate sportspeople in Poland